Silent Conflict is a 1948 American Western film directed by George Archainbaud and written by Charles Belden. The film stars William Boyd, Andy Clyde, Rand Brooks, Virginia Belmont, Earle Hodgins and James Harrison. It was released on March 19, 1948, by United Artists.

Plot

Cast 
William Boyd as Hopalong Cassidy
Andy Clyde as California Carlson
Rand Brooks as Lucky Jenkins
Virginia Belmont as Rene Richards
Earle Hodgins as Doc Richards
James Harrison as Speed Blaney
Forbes Murray as Rancher Randall
John Butler as Inn Clerk Jeb
Herbert Rawlinson as Yardman Jake
Richard Alexander as Rancher
Don Haggerty as Rancher

References

External links 
 

1948 films
American black-and-white films
Films directed by George Archainbaud
United Artists films
American Western (genre) films
1948 Western (genre) films
Hopalong Cassidy films
1940s English-language films
1940s American films